Bab's Matinee Idol is a 1917 American silent romantic comedy film, based on the Mary Roberts Rinehart novels, produced by Famous Players-Lasky, and directed by J. Searle Dawley. This was the final film in the trilogy of Babs films that starred Marguerite Clark.

Plot
As described in a film magazine, Bab (Clark) is in love with Adrian (Steele), an actor, and cuts his picture out of a newspaper and worships it. An epidemic of measles breaks out and Bab is sent home. A few days later Bab learns that the play with her idol is in town, so she borrows money to see a performance with her hero. She writes him a note, and he invites her into his dressing room. She learns that unless the show gets more publicity, it will close. She arranges with Carter Brooks (Barrie) and her father (Losee) for Adrian to apply for work at her father's ammunition factory, and after he is thrown out the story will be in the newspapers. However, the Honorable Page Beresford (Chadwick), who is after Bab's sister Leila's (Greene) hand and fortune, arrives at the factory to place an order for shells and, mistaken for Adrian, gets thrown out. When the real Adrian applies for work, he is hired and not allowed to leave, and misses the matinee performance. His irate wife, searching for Adrian, soon puts matters right. Bab succumbs to the measles and the revelation that Adrian is married completely shatters her thoughts of romance, at least for the time being.

Cast
 Marguerite Clark as Bab Archibald
 Helen Greene as Leila Archibald
 Isabel O'Madigan as Mrs. Archibald
 Frank Losee as Mr. Archibald
 Nigel Barrie as Carter Brooks
 William Hinckley 
 Cyril Chadwick as Honorable Page Beresford
 Leone Morgan as Jane Raleigh
 Vernon Steele as Adrian Egleston
 George Odell as The Butler
 Daisy Belmore as Hannah

Preservation status
All three Bab's films are now presumed lost.

See also
 List of lost films
 Bab's Diary
 Bab's Burglar

References

External links

 
 

1917 films
1917 romantic comedy films
American romantic comedy films
American silent feature films
American black-and-white films
Films directed by J. Searle Dawley
Films based on works by Mary Roberts Rinehart
Lost American films
Paramount Pictures films
1917 lost films
Lost romantic comedy films
1910s American films
Silent romantic comedy films
Silent American comedy films
1910s English-language films